Song Eun-beom (born March 17, 1984) is South Korean professional baseball player for the LG Twins of the KBO League. He has represented the South Korea national baseball team at the 2010 Asian Games.

References

External links
 Roster Info: Song Eun-bum – Kia Tigers
Career statistics and player information from Korea Baseball Organization

SSG Landers players
Kia Tigers players
Hanwha Eagles players
KBO League pitchers
South Korean baseball players
Asian Games medalists in baseball
1984 births
Living people
Sportspeople from Incheon
Baseball players at the 2010 Asian Games
Asian Games gold medalists for South Korea
Medalists at the 2010 Asian Games
Yeosan Song clan